Ruslan İdiqov (born 29 March 1966) is an Azerbaijani professional football coach and a former player of Chechen descent. He also holds Russian citizenship.

Playing career
He made his professional debut in the Soviet Second League in 1984 for FC Terek Grozny.

Coaching career
He was appointed caretaker manager of FC Akhmat Grozny in the Russian Premier League on 2 September 2018 following the resignation of Igor Lediakhov.

International goals

Honours
 Russian Cup winner: 2004 (played in the early stages of the 2003/04 tournament for FC Terek Grozny).

References

1966 births
Sportspeople from Grozny
Living people
Russian footballers
Association football midfielders
Soviet footballers
Azerbaijani footballers
Azerbaijani expatriate footballers
Azerbaijan international footballers
Russian Premier League players
FC Akhmat Grozny players
FC Spartak Vladikavkaz players
FC KAMAZ Naberezhnye Chelny players
PFC Spartak Nalchik players
FC Angusht Nazran players
Azerbaijani football managers
Azerbaijani expatriate football managers
Russian football managers
Russian expatriate football managers
Expatriate footballers in Russia
FC Akhmat Grozny managers
Russian Premier League managers
Chechen people
Soviet Azerbaijani people
Expatriate football managers in Russia